2004–05 Eerste Klasse was a Dutch association football season of the Eerste Klasse.

Saturday champions were:
A: GVVV
B: DOTO
C: VV Kloetinge
D: SVZW Wierden
E: Drachtster Boys

Sunday champions were:
A: FC Hilversum
B: VVSB
C: VV Papendrecht
D: SV Panningen
E: WSV Apeldoorn
F: Sneek Wit Zwart

Eerste Klasse seasons
4